

Administrative and municipal divisions

References

Magadan Oblast
Magadan Oblast